Ou Beichoan is a khum (commune) of Ou Chrov District in Banteay Meanchey Province in north-western Cambodia.

Villages

 Choan Banteay Thmei(ជាន់បន្ទាយថ្មី)
 Chouk Chey(ជោគជ័យ)
 Ou Bei Choan(អូរបីជាន់)
 Prasat(ប្រាសាទ)
 Prey Chan (ព្រៃចាន់)
 Preav(ព្រាវ)
 Seila Khmaer(សីលាខ្មែរ)
 Snuol Tret(ស្នូលទ្រេត)
 Thnal Bat(ថ្នល់បត់)
 Tumnob Dach(ទំនប់ដាច់)
 Yeang Dangkum(យាងដង្គុំ)

References

Communes of Banteay Meanchey province
Ou Chrov District